The 1922 Stanley Cup Finals was contested by the National Hockey League (NHL) champion Toronto St. Patricks and the Pacific Coast Hockey Association (PCHA) champion Vancouver Millionaires. The St. Pats defeated Vancouver three games to two in the best-of-five game series to win their only Stanley Cup as the St. Pats.

This was the last Stanley Cup Finals contested by a team from Vancouver until the 1982 Stanley Cup Finals. All games were held at Arena Gardens in Toronto.

Paths to the Finals
Vancouver finished second overall in the 1921–22 PCHA regular season standings with a 12–12 record. However, they then went on to defeat the 12–11–1 first place Seattle Metropolitans in the PCHA championship series, winning both games by 1–0.

Meanwhile, the 1921–22 NHL season was capped with the 13–10–1 second place St. Patricks defeating the 14–8–2 first place Ottawa Senators, 5–4, in the two-game total goals NHL championship series.

After defeating the WCHL's Regina Capitals in the preliminary series, the PCHA's Vancouver Millionaires travelled to Toronto for the Final.

Game summaries
A fifth and deciding game five was necessary in this series to determine who would win the Cup. After Vancouver won game one, 4–3, Babe Dye scored 4:50 into overtime of game two to give Toronto a 2–1 win. Then in game three, goaltender Hugh Lehman led the Millionaires to a 3–0 shutout win. In this game, star
defenceman Harry Cameron suffered a separated shoulder and Toronto asked Frank Patrick for the use of Ottawa defenceman Eddie Gerard and Patrick permitted it. The St. Patricks tied the series in game four, 6–0, as John Ross Roach became the first rookie goaltender to record a Stanley Cup shutout. After this game, Patrick ruled Gerard ineligible. Game five belonged to Toronto as Dye scored four goals in a 5–1 victory to clinch the Cup.

For the series, Dye scored nine of the St. Pats' 16 goals, while Roach posted a 1.80 goals-against average.

Stanley Cup engraving

The 1922 Stanley Cup was presented by the trophy's trustee William Foran. The St. Patricks never did engrave their name on the Cup for their championship season. 

It was not until the trophy was redesigned in 1948 that the words "1922 Toronto St. Patricks" was put onto its then-new collar. 

The following St. Patricks players and staff were members of the Stanley Cup winning team.

1921–22 Toronto St. Patricks

See also
 1921–22 NHL season
 1921–22 PCHA season
 1921-22 WCHL season

References
Bibliography

Notes

Stanley Cup Finals
Stanley
Stan
Stan
1922
Stan
 
March 1922 sports events
Ice hockey competitions in Toronto
1922 in Ontario
1920s in Toronto